Oskaloosa College was a liberal arts college based out of Oskaloosa, Iowa.

Establishment

Work was begun on establishing the college in 1855, under the influence of Aaron Chatterson and was affiliated with the Christian Church (Disciples of Christ). 

The college was incorporated in 1858, but classes were not held until 1861. 

Its first president was George T. Carpenter. Mary Bell Smith, who went on to become the president of the Kansas Woman's Christian Temperance Union, taught at Oskaloosa College, 1863-65.

Decline

In 1881, all but one of the faculty left the college to start a new school in Des Moines, Iowa, which would later become Drake University; they were also joined by 47 (out of 300) students. 

For a good portion of its history, the school endured severe financial hardship, which eventually led to its demise in 1898.

Notable alumni 
Eleanor McWilliams Chamberlain, founder of Florida's suffrage movement
George W. Clarke, 21st Governor of Iowa from 1913 to 1917
William Temple Hornaday, zoologist, conservationist, taxidermist, and author
J. Howard Moore, zoologist, philosopher and educator
Eugene Claremont Sanderson, Christian minister and founder of Eugene Divinity School (now Northwest Christian University)
Isaac D. Young, U.S. Representative from Kansas

References

 
1855 establishments in Iowa
Defunct private universities and colleges in Iowa
Educational institutions established in 1855
Education in Mahaska County, Iowa
Liberal arts colleges in Iowa
Universities and colleges affiliated with the Christian Church (Disciples of Christ)